Panagiotis Drakopoulos (born 14 August 1965) is a Greek weightlifter. He competed in the men's heavyweight I event at the 1992 Summer Olympics.

References

1965 births
Living people
Greek male weightlifters
Olympic weightlifters of Greece
Weightlifters at the 1992 Summer Olympics
Sportspeople from Sydney
20th-century Greek people